The 2022 Contender Boats 300 was the 31st stock car race of the 2022 NASCAR Xfinity Series, the second race of the Round of 8, and the 29th iteration of the event. The race was held on Saturday, October 22, 2022, in Homestead, Florida at Homestead–Miami Speedway, a  permanent oval shaped racetrack. The race took the scheduled 200 laps to complete. Noah Gragson, driving for JR Motorsports, would win the race in a dominating fashion, leading 127 laps for his 13th career NASCAR Xfinity Series win, and his eighth of the season. He would also earn a spot in the championship 4. To fill out the podium, Ty Gibbs, driving for Joe Gibbs Racing, and A. J. Allmendinger, driving for Kaulig Racing, would finish 2nd and 3rd, respectively.

Background 
Homestead–Miami Speedway is a motor racing track located in Homestead, Florida. The track, which has several configurations, has promoted several series of racing, including NASCAR, the IndyCar Series, the WeatherTech SportsCar Championship series, and the Championship Cup Series.

From 2002 to 2019, Homestead–Miami Speedway had hosted the final race of the season in all three of NASCAR's series as Ford Championship Weekend: the NASCAR Cup Series, NASCAR Xfinity Series, and the NASCAR Camping World Truck Series. The races currently have the names Dixie Vodka 400, Contender Boats 250, and Baptist Health 200, respectively.

Entry list 

 (R) denotes rookie driver.
 (i) denotes driver who are ineligible for series driver points.

Practice 
The only 20-minute practice session was held on Friday, October 21, at 6:05 PM EST.

Qualifying 
Qualifying was held on Friday, October 21, at 6:35 PM EST. Since Homestead–Miami Speedway is an oval track, the qualifying system used is a single-car, one-lap system with only one round. Whoever sets the fastest time in the round wins the pole. Alex Labbé and Dillon Bassett would fail to qualify.

Race results 
Stage 1 Laps: 40

Stage 2 Laps: 40

Stage 3 Laps: 120

Standings after the race 

Drivers' Championship standings

Note: Only the first 12 positions are included for the driver standings.

References 

Contender Boats 300
NASCAR races at Homestead-Miami Speedway
Contender Boats 300
Contender Boats 300